Prince Junior Samolah Ngali (born 5 September 1985) is a professional footballer from the Central African Republic who plays as a goalkeeper for the Central African Republic national team.

He debuted internationally on 2 June 2012 at the 2014 FIFA World Cup qualifying matches against Botswana in a 2-0 victory.

Samolah also appeared at the 2018 FIFA World Cup qualiers and the 2022 FIFA World Cup qualifying match against Cape Verde in a 1-1 draw.

References

External links
 
 

1985 births
Living people
Central African Republic footballers
Central African Republic international footballers
Association football goalkeepers